Leon Stuart Camier (born 4 August 1986) is an English former solo motorcycle racer. For the 2021 season, Camier was announced as team manager for Honda World Superbike team, run under Honda Racing Corporation. After a long career in solo motorcycle racing he struggled with injuries and finally decided to end his competitive riding. 

After difficult 2018 and 2019 seasons with Honda satellite team Moriwaki Althea and suffering from injuries, for 2020 he was contracted to ride for Barni Ducati in WSBK, but continued to have shoulder injury problems and was unable to start the season and parted ways with Barni Ducati.

Early life

Camier was born in Ashford, Kent, England. His distant paternal ancestors were French Huguenots, although several generations of the family lived in Cork, Ireland. His appreciation of the music of Jack Johnson has been mentioned on ITV's racing coverage. He also enjoys System of a Down and Linkin Park. At 6'2", he is tall for his profession which has its disadvantages. According to ITV's coverage, he has a habit of walking around circuits the evening before races with the aim of spotting extra details about the track. This is a habit picked up from his Grasstrack days where this behaviour is usual. His nickname is Shafter. As well as racing, Camier also enjoyed playing football as a youngster for an Ashford-based club called Bliby. Camier resides in Andorra.

Career

Early career
After beginning Grasstrack racing aged 6 and winning five British championships, Camier became British Junior 80 cc Road Racing champion in 1998. He won the British 125 cc title in 2001 and the British Supersport crown in 2005. This period built a working relationship with Honda which included contesting the 2005 Suzuka 8 Hours race in 2005 at the age of 18 (unusually young for a non-Japanese rider).

He was the 2005 British Supersport and 2009 British Superbike Champion. 2010 was his first full season in the World Superbike series.

British Superbike Championship (2007–2009)

2007 was his first season in the British Superbike Championship on a Bike Animal Honda. He led the first corners of his very first race and was on the podium in the first three races. A crash in race 6 at Silverstone and two eighth places at Oulton Park damaged his momentum however. At Snetterton, a bike failure in qualifying saw him start 29th but he moved up to 6th in both races amidst Honda dominance. His season ended with a huge crash at Cadwell Park causing a broken left femur and right pelvis.

For 2008 he joined the GSE Racing Airwaves Ducati team alongside former champion Shane 'Shaky' Byrne. He finished fifth overall, taking his first three wins.

For 2009 GSE switched to Yamahas and James Ellison joined as him teammate. Camier quickly dominated the series, winning even more races than Byrne had in 2008. He clinched the title with four races to go fittingly by overtaking closest rival Ellison on the penultimate lap of race 1 at Silverstone. Immediately on returning to the pits he was greeted by Niall Mackenzie (the last man to win the BSB title on a Yamaha) decked out in his original 1998 Rob Mac Cadbury's Boost leathers. Camier ultimately won a record-breaking 18 races despite only leading out of the first corner twice.  His success led to the organisers of the series to adopt the "Showdown Rule" for 2010. This revised the points system to the split-season format popularly used by saloon-car series in the United States.

Superbike World Championship (2009–2020)
After winning the title, Camier was invited to join the Aprilia squad in the Superbike World Championship for the final two races of the season, replacing the injured Shinya Nakano. His first meeting at Magny-Cours saw him qualify 16th improving to set the fourth fastest warm-up time. Unfortunately, two technical problems meant he took no points. However, in the last meeting of the season at Portimao, Camier finished 6th and 7th.

Camier raced full-time with Aprilia in World Superbike in 2010. He finished second to teammate Max Biaggi in race two at Miller Motorsport Park, giving Aprilia their first 1–2 in the series. At his home round at Silverstone, Camier started 16th but fought back to finish sixth and third in the two races.

In late 2017, he signed to compete in the 2018 Superbike World Championship series aboard a Honda Fireblade SP2 for Ten Kate Racing as teammate to Jake Gagne. Camier continued with Honda into 2019, for the first time a full factory-backed team, with teammate Ryuichi Kiyonari.

For the 2020 season he was contracted to ride for Barni Ducati, but continuing shoulder injury problems prevented a start the season and he parted ways with Barni.

Previously he competed since 2015 for MV Agusta Reparto Corse in World Superbikes aboard an MV Agusta F4.

Career statistics

All-time statistics

British Supersport Championship

Races by year
(key)

British Superbike Championship

Races by year
(key) (Races in bold indicate pole position, races in italics indicate fastest lap)

Supersport World Championship

Races by year
(key) (Races in bold indicate pole position, races in italics indicate fastest lap)

Superbike World Championship

Races by year
(key) (Races in bold indicate pole position, races in italics indicate fastest lap)

Grand Prix motorcycle racing

By season

Races by year
(key) (Races in bold indicate pole position, races in italics indicate fastest lap)

References

External links

 
 Profile on MotoGP.com
 Profile on WorldSBK.com
 Leon Camier – full profile
 British Superbike Championship

1986 births
Living people
People from Ashford, Kent
British Supersport Championship riders
British Superbike Championship riders
English motorcycle racers
Superbike World Championship riders
Supersport World Championship riders
125cc World Championship riders
Aspar Racing Team MotoGP riders
MotoGP World Championship riders